The Charitable Corporation v Sutton (1742) 26 ER 642 is an important old English law case which holds in substance that a director of a company owes duties to the company in the same measure and quality as does a trustee to a trust. It makes the point that judges should not be quick to judge decisions of directors with hindsight.

Facts
The Charitable Corporation was a company set up by Royal Charter, to give loans of money to poor people, to prevent them falling into the hands of pawnbrokers. The directors (or committee-men as they were called at the time) were accused of failing to properly monitor the procedures for loans by the corporation. It had suffered a loss of around £350,000. A warehouse keeper was responsible for giving unsecured loans to fellow directors. Only five directors were actively involved in the corporation's affairs. It was alleged that the failure of the remaining forty-five directors to maintain oversight made them guilty of gross negligence.

Judgment
Lord Hardwicke held that because the directors are agents of the people who grant them power to manage the corporation's affairs they are liable for any negligent acts or omissions. He held that the five who were engaged in taking money were liable to make good all losses, and that the remaining forty-five were liable to make up any shortfall. His judgment read as follows.

See also

Directors' duties
UK company law
United States corporate law

References
MJ Trebilcock, 'The Liability of Company Directors for Negligence' (1969) 32 Modern Law Review 499 saying the case ‘has been regarded as something of a high point in the duty of care the law has demanded of directors’.

Other articles
B Fischhoff, 'Debiasing' in D Kahneman, P Slovic and A Tversky (eds) Judgment Under Uncertainty: Heuristics and Biases (Cambridge University Press 1982)
WT Allen, JE Jacobs and LB Strine Jr, 'Realigning The Standard Of Review Of Director Due Care With Delaware Public Policy: A Critique of Van Gorkom And Its Progeny As A Standard Of Review Problem' (2002) 96 North Western University Law Review 449

United Kingdom company case law
1742 in British law
History of corporate law
Court of Chancery cases